Garrysallagh is a townland in County Westmeath, Ireland.

Garrysallagh is one of 11 townlands of the civil parish of Stonehall in the barony of Corkaree in the Province of Leinster. 
The south–western boundary of the townland is formed by the River Gaine, a tributary of the River Inny.

The neighbouring townlands are: Galmoylestown Lower to the north, Galmoylestown Upper to the east, Ballynagall and Kilmaglish to the south and Down and Loughanstown to the west.

In the 1911 census of Ireland there were 5 houses and 17 inhabitants in the townland.

References

External links
Garrysallagh at the IreAtlas Townland Data Base
Garrysallagh at Townlands.ie
Garrysallagh at Logainm.ie

Townlands of County Westmeath